HWO may refer to:

 Hazardous weather outlook
 Hwana language, spoken in Nigeria
 Hydraulic workover
 North Perry Airport, in Florida, United States
 Home walkover in rugby